Brownhills Ormiston Academy is a co-educational secondary school located in Brownhills in the West Midlands of England.

Originally known as Brownhills Comprehensive School, it has subsequently been renamed Brownhills Community School, Brownhills Community Technology College, Brownhills Sports College and Brownhills School over the years. As of 1 April 2020, it is an academy sponsored by Ormiston Academies Trust.

Brownhills Ormiston Academy offers GCSEs and BTECs as programmes of study for pupils.

Notable former pupils
Erin O'Connor, model

References

External links
Brownhills Ormiston Academy official website

Secondary schools in Walsall
Academies in Walsall
Ormiston Academies